Thug Mentality 1999 is the debut solo studio album by American rapper Krayzie Bone. It was released April 6, 1999 on Ruthless Records, Relativity Records and Mo Thugs Records.

The double-disc album featured a large selection of guest appearances, including Bone Thugs-n-Harmony, Mariah Carey, The Marley Brothers, Big Pun, Fat Joe, Cuban Link, Gangsta Boo, E-40, 8Ball & MJG, Kurupt, Treach and Snoop Dogg.

The album was supported by two singles: "Thug Mentality" and "Paper". The album's lead single, titled "Thug Mentality" was released on March 20, 1999. The song was produced by Michael Seifert, it peaked at number 47 on the Hot R&B/Hip-Hop Songs, and at number 36 on the R&B/Hip-Hop Airplay.

Thug Mentality 1999 debuted at number four on the Billboard 200 with 140,000 album-equivalent units in its first week. The album was certified Platinum by the Recording Industry Association of America (RIAA) on May 10, 1999. The album has sold 1,000,000 copies in the United States. The albums marks the third solo album by a member of Bone Thugs-n-Harmony.

Background

In an interview with HipHopDX, Krayzie Bone spoke on the creation of the album: I’d have to say that was the easiest album to make because I had so much material and so much stuff backed up. We was fresh, still not that far from being on the streets. I still had a lot of material that I had that I wanted to get off my chest. It was a breeze. A lot of those tracks, I had the ideas [first] and then I went in and laid them straight out. Some of the stuff was from what we didn’t use from Art Of War. On Art Of War, I would basically start the songs off and everyone else would just come in and do what they do. What dudes didn’t use, I just kept stashed away and when it was time work on my album, I just brought them out.

Krayzie Bone wrote and recorded over 150 songs for the album, of which thirty-eight made the album's final cut as a double album.

Singles
The album's lead single, titled "Thug Mentality" was released on March 20, 1999. The song was produced by Michael Seifert. It peaked at number 16 on the Hot R&B/Hip-Hop Songs, and at number 31 on the R&B/Hip-Hop Airplay.

The album's second single, titled "Paper" was released in October 1999. The song was produced by Krayzie Bone himself. The song's accompanying music video was later released that year.

Critical reception

Thug Mentality 1999 was met with generally mixed to positive reviews from music critics. Stephen Thomas Erlewine from AllMusic gave Thug Mentality 1999 a 3/5 rating and wrote: "Krayzie doesn't hesitate to accentuate the already smooth surfaces of his music. Some of these cuts are positively smoove, which stands in direct contrast to the gangstafied lyrics, but that's always been a part of the Bone trademark". He also criticized the excessive number of songs that made the final cut on the album and he wrote: "Krayzie tries to keep it interesting by varying the flow, never putting too many similar tracks next to each other, but who the hell can make it through 38 tracks of this without a breather, even if some cuts are skits? It may be a cliche to say that this double-record would have been much more potent if it was trimmed to a single disc, but that doesn't make it less true, especially since there are enough songs to make a very good record, possibly one of the best things Krayzie has been involved with". Entertainment Weekly gave Thug Mentality 1999 a B+ rating and wrote: "Bone-Thugs-N-Harmony’s main man gets millennial with a 38-track double CD, the best solo release so far from one of the Ohio speed rappers". RapReviews gave Thug Mentality 1999 a 5/10 rating and wrote: "Krayzie displays a wide range of flows and deliveries, often on single tracks. The opener "Heated Heavy" is impressive because it features quite possibly the fastest rapping I've ever heard—if there was any question, Krayzie could give Twista a run for his money any day."

Commercial performance
Thug Mentality 1999 debuted at number four on the Billboard 200 with 140,000 album-equivalent units in its first week. The album was certified Platinum by the Recording Industry Association of America (RIAA) in May 10, 1999. The album has sold 1,000,000 copies in the United States.

Track listing

Disc one

Disc two

Notes
 signifies an co-producer

Sample credits
 "Paper" contains elements of "Closer Than Friends" & "You Are My Everything", written by David Townsend and Bernard Jackson, and performed by Surface.
 "Dummy Man (Skit)" contains replayed elements from "The Candy Man", written by Leslie Bricusse and Anthony Newley, and performed by Sammy Davis Jr.
 "Thug Alwayz" contains elements from "Share My Love", written by J. Bradford and G. Jones, and performed by Rare Earth.
 "Smokin' Budda" contains elements from "Sara Smile", written by Daryl Hall and John Oates.
 "We Starvin'" contains replayed elements from "Theme From The Young & Restless", written by P. Botkin Jr. and B. DeVorson.
 "Murda Mo" samples "Moments In love" written and performed by Art Of Noise.

Charts

Weekly charts

Year-end charts

Certifications

Release history

References 

1999 debut albums
Horrorcore albums
Krayzie Bone albums
Ruthless Records albums
Albums produced by KayGee
Albums produced by Damizza
Albums recorded at Chung King Studios
Albums recorded at Westlake Recording Studios
Gangsta rap albums by American artists